Hip Hop and the World We Live In is a studio album by American rapper Aceyalone. Entirely produced by Elusive, it was released on Project Blowed and Decon in 2002.

Critical reception
Julianne Escobedo Shepherd of Pitchfork gave the album a 7.5 out of 10 and described it as "a good, solid example of the art of rhyme." Steve Juon of RapReviews.com gave the album an 8 out of 10, calling it "another album that will keep Aceyalone's loyal hip-hop audience pleased." He said, "the album's only clear flaw is that the soundtrack is too static for a mic controller that's so dynamic."

Track listing

References

External links
 

2002 albums
Aceyalone albums
Decon albums